Jordan Burrow (born 12 September 1992) is an English professional footballer who plays as a striker for  club Boston United. He has played in the Football League for Morecambe and Stevenage.

A product of Chesterfield's youth system, Burrow joined the club aged seven and went on to sign his first professional contract with the club in May 2011. He spent the opening months of the 2011–12 season on loan at Conference North club Boston United. On his return to Chesterfield in December that year, he was released by the club, having made no first-team appearances. He subsequently signed for Morecambe of League Two in January 2012, and made over 50 appearances during his 18-month stay with the club. In May 2013, Burrow signed for League One club Stevenage.

Career

Chesterfield
Burrow was born in Sheffield, South Yorkshire. He began his career at Chesterfield at the age of seven and progressed through the various youth ranks over an eleven-year period. Having played regularly for the club's reserve team during the 2010–11 season, scoring 26 goals that year, he signed his first professional contract with Chesterfield in May 2011, agreeing a six-month contract. A month into 2011–12, Burrow joined Conference North club Boston United on 21 September 2011 on a one-month loan agreement to gain first-team experience. Boston managers Lee Canoville and Jason Lee had previously been to watch the player, and managed to acquire Burrow's services after Jason Lee spoke to former teammate and Chesterfield goalkeeping coach Mark Crossley about the possibility of a loan move. He made his debut three days after signing, on 24 September, coming on as a 54th-minute substitute and scoring the winning goal in a 2–1 home victory over Droylsden with a looping header. His loan was subsequently extended for a further month in October 2011, and he went on to make 11 appearances during his two-month stay at Boston. Burrow returned to Chesterfield in December, but was released from his contract later that month having made no first-team appearances for the club.

Morecambe
Following his release from Chesterfield, Burrow went on trial with League Two club Morecambe and played in a number of reserve matches during the opening weeks of January 2012. The trial proved to be successful, and he joined the club on an 18-month contract on 21 January 2012. Burrow made his first-team debut on 11 February 2012, in a 2–1 defeat away to Bristol Rovers, coming on as a 72nd-minute substitute. He subsequently made his first start three days later, playing the first 77 minutes as Morecambe secured a 1–0 home win over Macclesfield Town. He scored his first goal for the club shortly after, bundling in Lewis Alessandra's left-wing free kick to score the only goal in a 1–0 home victory against Southend United. Burrow ended the season in good goalscoring form, scoring in consecutive 3–2 away defeats to Burton Albion and Rotherham United, before scoring a headed goal in a 2–2 home draw with Plymouth Argyle to make it three goals in four matches. He scored four times in 19 appearances for Morecambe in the 2011–12 season.

He remained at Morecambe for 2012–13, and started in the club's first match of the season on 12 August 2012 as they secured a 2–1 win over Championship team Blackpool at Bloomfield Road in the League Cup. Burrow suffered knee ligament damage in Morecambe's 4–1 home win over Barnet on 10 November 2012, and was expected to be out of first-team action for three months. However, he returned to face his former club, Chesterfield, just five weeks later, appearing as a 79th-minute substitute in 1–1 away draw. Burrow scored his only goal of the season on 8 January 2013, netting from close range in Morecambe's 2–1 home victory over Dagenham Redbridge, a match that was played in front of the club's biggest crowd of the season. He only scored once in 35 appearances in 2012–13.

Stevenage
Shortly after the end of the season, Burrow rejected Morecambe's offer of a new contract on reduced terms and opted to sign for League One club Stevenage on a two-year contract 31 May 2013. He made a goalscoring debut for Stevenage on 
6 August 2013, converting Luke Freeman's low cross from close range in a 2–0 home victory over Championship team Ipswich Town in the League Cup. Burrow was released by Stevenage at the end of 2013–14.

Lincoln City
Burrow signed for Conference Premier club Lincoln City on 21 May 2014 on a two-year contract. He made his debut in a 0–0 home draw with Kidderminster Harriers on 9 August 2014 and scored his first goal three days later in a 2–1 win away to Altrincham. He was made available for transfer by Lincoln at the end of 2014–15, before having his contract cancelled by mutual consent on 24 June 2015.

York City
Burrow signed for National League North club York City on 9 May 2018.

Career statistics

Honours
F.C. Halifax Town
FA Trophy: 2015–16

References

External links

Profile at the York City F.C. website

1992 births
Living people
Footballers from Sheffield
English footballers
England semi-pro international footballers
Association football forwards
Chesterfield F.C. players
Boston United F.C. players
Morecambe F.C. players
Stevenage F.C. players
Lincoln City F.C. players
FC Halifax Town players
Gateshead F.C. players
York City F.C. players
National League (English football) players
English Football League players